Lachnoanaerobaculum orale  is a Gram-positive, saccharolytic, non-proteolytic, anaerobic and spore-forming bacterium from the genus of Lachnoanaerobaculum which has been isolated from the saliva from a man in Stockholm in Sweden.

References

External links
Type strain of Lachnoanaerobaculum orale at BacDive -  the Bacterial Diversity Metadatabase

Lachnospiraceae
Bacteria described in 2012